Doug Cameron may refer to:
Doug Cameron (musician), Canadian musician
Doug Cameron (politician) (born 1951), Australian politician and trade unionist
Doug Cameron (rugby league), former 1950s halfback for the Eastern Suburbs football club
Doug Cameron (engineer), American engineer, inventor, and investor

See also 
 Douglas Cameron (disambiguation)